The Polo Grounds were three stadiums in Upper Manhattan, New York City.

Polo Grounds may also refer to:

 A polo field
 Polo Fields, a multi-purpose stadium in Golden Gate Park, San Francisco
 Polo Grounds Music, an American hip hop and R&B record label
 Polo Grounds, New Inn, a defunct sports ground and racing track in New Inn, South Wales

See also
 Polo (disambiguation)